Zeliha Ağrıs (born 20 January 1998) is a Turkish taekwondo practitioner who became a world champion in the bantamweight category in 2017.

Private life
Zeliha Ağrıs was born in Beyşehir, Konya Province, Turkey, on 20 January 1998. She grew up in Konya, where her father runs a restaurant.

She was a very energetic girl in her childhood. She was impressed by taekwondo practitioners performing in a nearby gym. In the beginning, her father was not willing to let his daughter perform taekwondo. A trainer in the gym persuaded her father. She started performing taekwondo at age ten. Her parents supported her later on.

She is a student in the School of Sports science at Selçuk University in Konya.

Sport career

She debuted internationally at the 2011 European Cadets Taekwondo Championships held in Tbilisi, Georgia, competing in the -41 kg event.

She won her first international medal at the 2013 European Junior Taekwondo Championships in Porto, Portugal, reaching bronze in the -55 kg event. In 2014, she took the silver medal in the -55 kg event at the Telleborg Open in Sweden. Ağrıs received the gold medal at the 2015 European Junior Taekwondo Championships in Daugavpils, Latvia. She captured the bronze medal at the 2016 European Taekwondo Championships  in Montreux, Switzerland. She took the bronze medal at the ETU European Under 21 Taekwondo Championships 2017 in Sofia, Bulgaria, the silver medal  at the 2017 Islamic Solidarity Games in Baku, Azerbaijan, and the gold medal at the 2017 World Taekwondo Championships in Muju, South Korea, in the bantamweight category when she was 19 years of age. She had beaten the bronze medallist, Dinorahon Mamadibragimova, in the semi final before beating Tatiana Kudashova 11-8 in the final.

Ağrıs won a bronze medal in Rome, another in Moscow at the 2018 World Taekwondo Grand Prix. The same year, she won another bronze medal at the European Taekwondo Under 21 Championships in Warsaw. At the G4 Extra European Taekwondo Championships held in Bari, Italy, in 2019, she captured the silver medal in the -53 kg event. In 2020, she won the gold medal at the 8th Open European Clubs Championships in Zagreb, Croatia. She won the silver medal in the -53 kg event at the 2021 European Taekwondo Championships in Sofia.

Tournament record

References

External links

1998 births
Living people
People from Beyşehir
Sportspeople from Konya
Turkish female taekwondo practitioners
World Taekwondo Championships medalists
European Taekwondo Championships medalists
Selçuk University alumni
Islamic Solidarity Games medalists in taekwondo
Islamic Solidarity Games competitors for Turkey
21st-century Turkish sportswomen